Shenzhou or Shen Prefecture was a zhou (prefecture) in imperial China centering in modern Shenzhou, Hebei, China. It existed (intermittently) from 596 to 1913.

The modern city Shenzhou, established in 1994, retains its name.

References
 

Prefectures of the Sui dynasty
Prefectures of the Tang dynasty
Prefectures of Later Liang (Five Dynasties)
Prefectures of Later Tang
Prefectures of Later Jin (Five Dynasties)
Prefectures of Later Han (Five Dynasties)
Prefectures of Later Zhou
Prefectures of the Song dynasty
Prefectures of the Jin dynasty (1115–1234)
Prefectures of the Yuan dynasty
Former prefectures in Hebei